Óscar Acosta Zeledón (14 April 1933 – 15 July 2014) was a Honduran writer, poet, critic, politician and diplomat.

He was born in the Las Delicias neighborhood of Tegucigalpa, Honduras, on 14 April 1933.

Acosta began his career as a journalist in Peru for Tegucigalpa Magazine. He founded la Editorial Nuevo Continente, las revistas Extra, Presente, la Editorial Iberoamericana, and Honduras Literaria y Extra. 
He was director of the University Press of the Universidad Nacional Autónoma de Honduras.

Acosta died in Tegucigalpa at the age of 81 on 15 July 2014.

Bibliography 
Responso poético al cuerpo presente de José Trinidad Reyes (1955)
El arca (1956)
Poesía menor (1957)
Tiempo detenido (1962)
Mi país (1971)
Poesía. Selección 1952–1965 (1965)
Poesía. Selección 1952–1971 (1976)
Rafael Heliodoro Valle. Vida y obra (1964)

Awards 
1960: Premio Rubén Darío
1979: Premio Nacional de Literatura Ramón Sosa

Literary works 
He also compiled poems from other authors in works such as Antología de la nueva poesía hondureña (1967) y Poesía hondureña de hoy (1971). In his studies he emphasizes Rafael Heliodoro Valle, vida y obra (1964). His poetry is profound and serene, with an intimate tone.

It is pertinent to mention the book "Poesía", a selection of poems that the Poet Óscar Acosta created between the years 1952–1971 in Spain, Madrid, was published in 1976 by the publishing house "Ediciones Cultura Hispánica". This selection of exclusive and intimate poetry by the author contains 111 poems, separated into the following classifications:

Poesía menor, a book that was published in the year 1957. In the essay "Anticipación el geranio" by Dr. Hector M. Leyva, which was published in the text "Lucidez Creativa", addresses the idea that short poems contain an affirmative action, in the sense that it can reclaim those things that may be despised, or negatively discriminated against. Short poetry, of the most basic, and modest. Modest poetry that alludes to bombast, in low key. Poetry spoken softly but not simply. If in the slightest it refers to the conscience, of the barely perceptible accidents of the world, then that poetry can be one of the most important.

In the case of the woman that is loved in Óscar Acosta's collection of poetry, the primary motive of his song in Formas del amor (1959), Escritura amorosa (1962) and Poemas para una muchacha (1963), the poet is convinced that he received the woman as a gift from heaven and that there may be no feeling as important as love.

References

1933 births
2014 deaths
20th-century Honduran poets
20th-century male writers
Honduran male poets
Honduran diplomats
People from Tegucigalpa